Street Jams is a series of  compilation albums issued by Rhino Entertainment between 1992 and 1994. The albums catalogue a number of influential old school hip hop and electro 12" singles that were released in the early to mid-1980s.

While a few of the singles are early releases from Hip-Hop artists who would go on to greater success later on in the decade such as Run-DMC and Slick Rick, the majority of the tracks in the series are considered one-hit wonders by acts who have fallen into relative obscurity but that had a profound impact upon the Hip-Hop/electro scene of the 1980s and influenced some of the more well known artists of that time.

Series Listing

Electric Funk
 Street Jams: Electric Funk, Volume 1
 Street Jams: Electric Funk, Volume 2
 Street Jams: Electric Funk, Volume 3
 Street Jams: Electric Funk, Volume 4

Hip-Hop From the Top
 Street Jams: Hip-Hop From the Top, Part 1
 Street Jams: Hip-Hop From the Top, Part 2
 Street Jams: Hip-Hop From the Top, Part 3
 Street Jams: Hip-Hop From the Top, Part 4

Compilation album series
Hip hop compilation albums
1990s compilation albums